The Natural Regional Park of Serre is a protected natural area of Calabria, Italy created in 2004.

Geography 
Located between Aspromonte and La Sila, it is crossed by two mountain ranges, Monte Pecoraro and Monte Covello, large forests, including the Wood of Stilo, and rivers with waterfalls, including Marmarico Falls, near Bivongi, and Pietracupa Falls, near Guardavalle.

Fauna 
The animals present in the park:

Mammals 
Cervus elaphus (deer) present only at Villa Vittoria
Capreolus capreolus (roe deer) present only at Villa Vittoria
Dama dama (fallow deer) present only at Villa Vittoria
Ovis musimon (mouflon) present only at Villa Vittoria
Canis lupus italicus (Apennine wolf)
Sus scrofa (wild boar)
Meles meles (European badger)
Martes foina (beech marten)
Lepus corsicanus (Corsican hare)
Mustela putorius (European polecat)
Martes martes (European marten)
Mustela nivalis (least weasel)
Vulpes vulpes (red fox)
Felis silvestris (European wildcat)
Apodemus sylvaticus (wood mouse)
Microtus arvalis (common vole)

Birds 
Pavo cristatus (peacock) present only at Villa Vittoria
Pandion haliaetus (osprey) present only at lago Angitola
Podiceps cristatus (great crested grebe) present only at lago Angitola
Aythya nyroca (ferruginous duck) present only at lago Angitola
Casmerodius albus (great white egret)  present only at lago Angitola
Falco peregrinus (peregrine falcon)
Buteo buteo (common buzzard)
Turdus philomelos (song thrush)
Falco vespertinus (red-footed falcon)
Ardea cinerea (gray heron)
Bubo bubo (Eurasian eagle-owl)
Asio otus (long-eared owl)
Corvus corax (common raven)
Scolopax rusticola (Eurasian woodcock)
Parus major (great tit)
Oriolus oriolus (Eurasian golden oriole)
Turdus pilaris (fieldfare)
Coturnix coturnix (common quail)
Phasianus colchicus (ring-necked pheasant)
Upupa epops (Eurasian hoopoe)
Pica pica (Eurasian magpie)
Carduelis carduelis (goldfinch)
Erithacus rubecula (European robin)
Picus viridis (European green woodpecker)
Dendrocopos major (great spotted woodpecker)
Corvus cornix (hooded crow)

Reptiles 
Elaphe quatuorlineata (four-lined snake)
Natrix natrix (water snake)
Vipera aspis (asp)
Hierophis viridiflavus (green whip snake)
Podarcis muralis (common wall lizard)

Amphibians 
Salamandra salamandra (fire salamander)
Bufo bufo (common toad)

Insects:
Vanessa atalanta (red admiral butterfly)
Cicadidae (cicada)

Points of interest 
Angitola
Abbazia della Certosa e Museo della Certosa (Serra San Bruno)
 (Monterosso Calabro)
 (Monterosso Calabro)
Villa Vittoria (Mongiana)

See also 

Serre calabresi
Ferdinandea
Monte Pecoraro

References

External links 

Parks in Calabria
Protected areas established in 2004